The 1931 Giro d'Italia was the 19th edition of the Giro d'Italia, organized and sponsored by the newspaper La Gazzetta dello Sport. The race was won by the Francesco Camusso of the Gloria team. Second and third respectively were the Italian riders Luigi Giacobbe and Luigi Marchisio.

It was the first edition in which the leader used the pink jersey (maglia rosa) for the leader of the general classification. The first cyclist to wear it was Learco Guerra.

Participants

Of the 109 riders that began the Giro d'Italia on 10 May, 65 of them made it to the finish in Milan on 31 May. Riders were allowed to ride on their own or as a member of a team. There were seven teams that competed in the race: Bianchi-Pirelli, Ganna-Dunlop, Gloria-Hutchinson, Legnano-Hutchinson, Maino-Clément, Touring-Pirelli, and Olympia-Spiga.

The peloton was primarily composed of Italians. The field featured three former Giro d'Italia champions in four-time winner Alfredo Binda, single-time winner Gaetano Belloni, and reigning champion Luigi Marchisio. Other notable Italian riders that started the race included Learco Guerra, Michele Mara, Felice Gremo, and Domenico Piemontesi. Frenchman Antonin Magne — who would go on to win the Tour de France twice — competed in the race, as well as future world champion, Belgian rider Jean Aerts. This race also saw the first Spanish riders compete with Mariano Cañardo and Ricardo Montero.

Final standings

Stage results

General classification

There were 65 cyclists who had completed all fifteen stages. For these cyclists, the times they had needed in each stage was added up for the general classification. The cyclist with the least accumulated time was the winner. Aristide Cavallini won the prize for best ranked isolati rider in the general classification.

References

Footnotes

Citations

G
Giro d'Italia
Giro d'Italia
Giro d'Italia by year